This is a chronological list of mayors of Radoviš.

List

External links
Official Web Site of the Municipality of Radoviš

References

Mayors
Mayors of places in North Macedonia